Sleagill is a small village and civil parish in the Eden district of Cumbria, England. At the 2011 census Sleagill was grouped with Newby giving a total population of 282.

Location 

Amenities 
Sleagill has one place of worship.

Transport 
For transport there is the A6, the A66 and the M6 motorway a few miles away.

Nearby settlements 
Nearby settlements include the large town of Penrith, the small town of Appleby-in-Westmorland, the villages of Morland, King's Meaburn, Cliburn, Newby and Little Strickland and the hamlets of Littlebeck and Reagill.

See also

Listed buildings in Sleagill

References

External links
 Cumbria County History Trust: Sleagill (nb: provisional research only – see Talk page)

Villages in Cumbria
Civil parishes in Cumbria
Eden District